O with ogonek (majuscule: Ǫ, minuscule: ǫ) is a letter of the Latin alphabet formed by addition of the ogonek to the letter O. It is used in Western Apache, Mescalero-Chiricahua, Muscogee, Dadibi, Gwichʼin, and Navajo. It is also used in the Latin transcription of Old Church Slavonic, and Proto-Slavic language, as well as in Slavistic Phonetic Alphabet. It is also still in use for the writing of Old Norse, and used to be used sporadically in Polish.

Usage 
The letter is used in autochthonic languages of North America: Western Apache, Mescalero-Chiricahua, Muscogee, Dadibi, Gwichʼin, and Navajo. In such languages, it represents either nasalized close-mid back rounded vowel ([õ]), or nasalized ([ɔ̃]).

It is also used in the Latin transcription of Old Church Slavonic where it represents the nasal back vowel, as well as in Proto-Slavic language where it represents labialized non-front vowel. It is also used in Slavistic Phonetic Alphabet, where it represents the nasalized O-sound, for example, the pronunciation of Ą in Polish.

It was used in the Old Norse, where it represented the open back rounded vowel ([ɒ]) sound. Additionally, the letter sporadically used to be an alternative to Ą in Polish.

Encoding

References

Bibliography 
 J.M. McDonough, The Navajo Sound System. Kluwer Academic Publishers, 2003. ISBN 978-1-4020-1351-5.
 Michał Suchorowski, Zabawki dramatyczne. vol. 1. Lviv. 1831.

Latin letters with diacritics
Phonetic transcription symbols
Polish letters with diacritics